Marcus Johnny Rashaan Keene (born May 6, 1995) is an American basketball player for SIG Strasbourg of the French LNB Pro A. He gained national prominence in 2016–17 season as a redshirt junior while at Central Michigan University, having been profiled by Sports Illustrated, the NCAA, and ESPN because of his prolific scoring ability. Keene is a 5'9" point guard who averaged 30.0 points per game his junior year at Central Michigan, the highest average in NCAA Division I men's basketball that season.

High school career
Keene born in a military hospital in Germany, where his parents were serving in the Air Force. Keene attended Earl Warren High School in San Antonio, Texas, where scored over 1,600 points in his career and graduated as the school's all-time leading scorer. During Keene's sophomore and junior years combined he scored 781 points, and in his senior season alone he scored 869. Keene's junior year saw him get named to the all-state, all-city, and Super-City Team. In Keene's senior season, he averaged 25 points, four rebounds, and four assists per game. He only had one Division I scholarship offer heading into his senior year, Youngstown State, which he accepted.

College career

Youngstown State
Keene's freshman season at Youngstown State (2013–14) saw him have moderate success. He averaged 6.5 points per game in 22 games played, including one start. He totaled 149 points on the year. In 2014–15, his season was "up and down," but he performed well by averaging 15.6 points per game, which led the team and was sixth-highest in the Horizon League. At one point he was suspended for breaking a teammate's nose, and his overall satisfaction was not high; Keene wanted to play point guard but had been designated as a spot-up shooting guard. After a game against Central Michigan, whose up-tempo offense and "free-wheeling" style of play appealed to Keene, he had a conversation with a Central Michigan assistant coach. Keene then chose to transfer shortly thereafter.

Central Michigan
In 2015–16, Keene had to sit out his first season at Central Michigan due to NCAA transfer eligibility rules. During that season he played as a scout teamer against the starters but he frequently dominated them. One time, Keene scored 37 points against them in a scrimmage. Fellow guard Braylon Rayson said, "We couldn’t do nothing with him. It was to the point where we just had to live with it."

Keene exploded onto the national college basketball scene when he became eligible in 2016–17. Through YouTube-worthy highlights, SportsCenter Top 10 game-winning shots, and his nation-leading scoring average, sports media have paid attention to him. On January 21, 2017, Keene scored 50 points against Miami (Ohio), including 10 made three-point field goals. It was the highest single game scoring output by anyone in Division I that season. On February 9, he was named as a top-20 finalist for the John R. Wooden Award, given annually to the nation's best player. Keene finished the 2016–17 season averaging 30.0 points per game, becoming the first player to average at least 30 points  since LIU Brooklyn's Charles Jones during the 1996–97 season 20 years earlier. On March 14, it was announced that Keene would test his 2017 NBA draft stock, with him having the option to return to Central Michigan before the NBA draft lottery is set. One month later, Keene signed an agent, thus ending his collegiate eligibility.

College statistics

|-
| align="left" | 2013–14
| align="left" | Youngstown State
| 22 || 1  || 16.3 || .370 || .324 || .757 || 1.9 || 2.2 || .5 || .0 ||6.5
|-
| align="left" | 2014–15
| align="left" | Youngstown State
| 32 || 32  || 34.9 || .449 || .419 || .787 || 3.5 || 2.8 || 1.1 || .1 ||15.6
|-
| align="left" | 2016–17
| align="left" | Central Michigan
| 32 || 32 || 36.8 || .447 || .368 || .819 || 4.5 || 4.9 || .8 || .0 ||style="background:#cfecec;" |30.0*
|-
| style="text-align:center;" colspan="2"|Career
| 86 || 65 || 30.9 || .440 || .381 || .805 || 3.5 || 3.4 || .8 || .0 || 18.6

Professional career

Dinamo Academy Cagliari (2017–2018)
After going undrafted in the 2017 NBA Draft, he joined the Washington Wizards for the 2017 NBA Summer League. After failing to be signed to a regular season contract with the Wizards, Keene signed to play in Italy's Serie A2 Basket league for the Cagliari Dinamo Academy. He averaged 18.8 points, 4.5 rebounds and 2.9 assists over 30 games in his first season.

Memphis Hustle (2018–2019)
On December 7, 2018, Keene signed with the Memphis Hustle of the NBA G League.

KCC Egis (2019–2020)
On March 1, 2019, Keene signed with the KCC Egis of the Korean Basketball League (KBL).

Sideline Cancer (2019–present)
Keene participated in The Basketball Tournament with Sideline Cancer. He started all 3 games leading the team to the Sweet 16 and to The Basketball Tournament 2019 Wichita Regional Championship Game. Keene returned to Sideline Cancer in 2020 and was the catalyst behind it advancing to its first TBT championship game. He was named to his first ever All TBT team. In 2021, Keene advanced his team as a #1 seed to the Elite 8 and he earned his 2nd All TBT selection.

Yulon Luxgen Dinos (2019–2020)
Keene signed with Yulon Luxgen Dinos of the Super Basketball League in Taiwan. He was named the Player of the Week for January 12–19, 2020.

Kalev/Cramo (2020–2021)
On August 27, 2020, Keene signed with Kalev/Cramo in the top tier Latvian–Estonian Basketball League.

Cedevita Olimpija (2021)
On July 4, 2021, Keene signed with KK Cedevita Olimpija in the top tier Slovenian Basketball League. After playing in 11 games in which he averaged 11.6 points and 3.1 assists per game, he parted ways with the team on November 14.

Pallacanestro Varese (2021–2022)
On November 16, 2021, Keene signed with Pallacanestro Varese of the Italian Lega Basket Serie A.

SIG Strasbourg (2022–present) 
On July 1, 2022, Keene signed with SIG Strasbourg of the French LNB Pro A.

See also
 List of NCAA Division I men's basketball season 3-point field goal leaders

References

1995 births
Living people
American expatriate basketball people in Estonia
American expatriate basketball people in Italy
American expatriate basketball people in Slovenia
American expatriate basketball people in South Korea
American expatriate basketball people in Taiwan
American men's basketball players
ASEAN Basketball League players
Basketball players from San Antonio
BC Kalev/Cramo players
Central Michigan Chippewas men's basketball players
Formosa Dreamers players
Jeonju KCC Egis players
Memphis Hustle players
Pallacanestro Varese players
Point guards
SIG Basket players
Super Basketball League imports
Youngstown State Penguins men's basketball players
Yulon Luxgen Dinos players